Glendo Reservoir is a reservoir located on the North Platte River in Platte County and Converse County in the U.S. State of Wyoming. The reservoir is formed by Glendo Dam.

The reservoir is popular for water sports and fishing.  It is located completely within Glendo State Park.

See also
List of largest reservoirs of Wyoming

References 

Lakes of Converse County, Wyoming
Lakes of Platte County, Wyoming
Reservoirs in Wyoming
Dams in Wyoming
Hydroelectric power plants in Wyoming
United States Bureau of Reclamation dams
Dams completed in 1958
Dams on the North Platte River
1958 establishments in Wyoming